The ADI Stallion is a US civil utility aircraft that first flew in July 1994. It is marketed in kit form for homebuilding by Aircraft Designs Inc.

Design and development 
The Stallion is a single-engined high-winged monoplane, with wings based on those of the Lancair ES and a retractable tricycle landing gear from the Lancair IV. It has a steel-tube fuselage center section, with the remainder of the airframe of composite construction, and is designed to be powered by engines of 230–350 hp (172–261 kW). The recommended engine is the  Continental IO-550, but engines as powerful as the  Walter M601 have been used. It is available in two versions, the four seat ADI Stallion and the six-seat Super Stallion.

Operational history
Seven examples had been completed and flown by December 2007.

Specifications (ADI Super Stallion – 350 hp engine)

See also

References

 Jackson, Paul. Jane's All The World's Aircraft 2003–2004. Coulsdon, UK: Jane's Information Group, 2003. .
 Taylor, Michael. Brassey's World Aircraft & Systems Directory 1999/2000. London: Brasseys, 1999. .

Single-engined tractor aircraft
High-wing aircraft
Homebuilt aircraft
1990s United States civil utility aircraft
Stallion